Vatica odorata is a tree in the family Dipterocarpaceae. The specific epithet  is from the Latin meaning "scented", referring to the flowers. Habitat is mixed dipterocarp forests from sea-level to  altitude. V. odorata is found from China to Indochina to Malesia.

References

odorata
Trees of China
Trees of Indo-China
Trees of Malesia
Plants described in 1854